Cyclophora intermixtaria is a moth of the family Geometridae first described by Charles Swinhoe in 1892. It is found in Taiwan, the Himalayas, Peninsular Malaysia and Borneo.

Subspecies
Cyclophora intermixtaria intermixtaria
Cyclophora intermixtaria collustrata Prout, 1938 (Borneo)

References

External links
Original description: 

Moths described in 1892
Cyclophora (moth)
Moths of Asia